Duco was a trade name assigned to a product line of automotive lacquer developed by the DuPont Company in the 1920s.  Under the Duco brand, DuPont introduced the first quick drying multi-color line of nitrocellulose lacquers made especially for the automotive industry. It was also used in paintings by American artist Jackson Pollock. 

It is now used by Nexa Autocolor — formerly ICI Autocolor and now a division of Pittsburgh-based PPG Industries — as a tradename for automotive enamels in Asia.

Duco is still used as an Australian colloquialism for automotive paint. It is currently widely used in the same way in Egypt (دوكو). It was (and partly still is) used in Hungarian as dukkó (noun) and dukkóz (verb). Also in Romania the term was in use with the same meaning until beginning of 2000.

Duco was the finish applied to National String Instrument Corporation brand of resonator guitars .

Duco coated is used in the plumbing industry to describe lacquered floor drains and other similar products.

Other uses

Duco is also a brand of nitrocellulose household cement (adhesive) originally trademarked by DuPont and now marketed in the U.S. by ITW Devcon.

An unrelated company with the same name designs and manufactures subsea umbilical cable systems. It is a subsidiary of the Technip Group, under the trademark Technip Umbilical Systems. The name Duco originates from Dunlop and Coflexip, when the Coflexip-Stena Offshore group acquired the subsea umbilical systems activity of the Dunlop group. The company has four locations: Newcastle (UK), Houston (US), Lobito (Angola), and Tanjung Langsat (Malaysia).

References

Australian English
Automotive chemicals
DuPont products
PPG Industries